Qush Bolagh (also Romanized as Qūsh Bolāgh) is a village in Leylan-e Shomali Rural District, Leylan District, Malekan County, East Azerbaijan Province, Iran. At the 2006 census, its population was 88, in 19 families.

References 

Populated places in Malekan County